Andrew Clayton (born 10 April 1973) is a male English former competition swimmer.

Swimming career
Clayton represented Great Britain in the Olympics, both the World championships and European championships, and he swam for England in the Commonwealth Games. Clayton twice competed at the Summer Olympics during 1996 and 2000 for Great Britain. He is best known for winning the 1997 European title in the men's 4×200 meter freestyle relay, alongside Paul Palmer, James Salter and Gavin Meadows. At the CASA National British Championships he won the 100 meter butterfly title in 1995.

He also represented England and won two bronze medals in the relay events, at the 1994 Commonwealth Games in Victoria, and in British Columbia, Canada. He also competed for England, at the 1998 Commonwealth Games in Kuala Lump, Malaysia, winning a silver medal.

See also
 List of Commonwealth Games medalists in swimming (men)

References

 

1973 births
Living people
English male freestyle swimmers
Olympic swimmers of Great Britain
Swimmers at the 1996 Summer Olympics
Swimmers at the 2000 Summer Olympics
Sportspeople from Bradford
Commonwealth Games silver medallists for England
Swimmers at the 1994 Commonwealth Games
Swimmers at the 1998 Commonwealth Games
World Aquatics Championships medalists in swimming
Medalists at the FINA World Swimming Championships (25 m)
European Aquatics Championships medalists in swimming
Commonwealth Games bronze medallists for England
Commonwealth Games medallists in swimming
Medallists at the 1994 Commonwealth Games
Medallists at the 1998 Commonwealth Games